Secretary for Justice v Yau Yuk Lung Zigo and Another  was a controversial and significant judicial review court case in Hong Kong. The case was mainly about sexual orientation discrimination and legal procedures of potentially unconstitutional legislation. The case also led to the creation of a new judicial review standard regarding discrimination and, later on, the extension of protection against domestic violence for LGBT community.

Background
In April 2004, the two male respondents in the case, who were 19 and 30 at the time, were found in engaging anal sex in a car parked beside a quiet and dark highway. The two were then prosecuted and charged with violations of Crimes Ordinance Section 118F(1) which prohibited sodomy in public. The case was the very first prosecution of Section 118F(1) since the enactment in 1991. The case was brought before a magistrate, Mr John T. Glass, whom then ruled Section 118F(1) unconstitutionally discriminatory against gay men and thus dismissed the charges.

The Government then appealed to the Court of Appeal. The appellate court subsequently upheld the magistrate's rulings. The case was, once again, appealed and brought before the Court of Final Appeal which ruled on the case in July 2007. The Court of Final Appeal upheld the lower courts’ rulings regarding the discriminatory nature of Section 118F(1) but revised the decisions relating to the legal procedures of a magistrate dismissing unconstitutional charges for future cases. (Court of Final Appeal judgement, paragraphs 4–5)

Relevant laws

The Justification Test
In assessing the constitutionality of Crimes Ordinance Section 118F(1), the Court of Final Appeal created the justification test. The test had been used in other cases but was only formally formulated and named in the case.

The Court ruled that equal protection was fundamental and essential to every Hong Kong citizen. However, the Court also recognised the fact that strict equal treatments may cause more harm than good, and different treatments may be warranted under certain circumstances. The Court thus created the justification test for assessing the legality of differential treatments. Any governmental differential treatments that could survive under the scrutiny of the justification test would be deemed constitutional. The Court laid out the requirements under the test:
 The difference in treatment must pursue a legitimate aim. For any aim to be legitimate, a genuine need for such difference must be established.
 The difference in treatment must be rationally connected to the legitimate aim.
 The difference in treatment must be no more than is necessary to accomplish the legitimate aim.

(Court of Final Appeal judgement, paragraphs 19–22)

Major issues
Before hearing the oral arguments, the Court of Final Appeal identified two issues:
 Is Crimes Ordinance Section 118F(1) discriminatory to the extent that it is inconsistent with the Basic Law and the Hong Kong Bill of Rights Ordinance?
 What is the proper order to be made when the charge against the defendant is found to be unconstitutional?
(Court of Final Appeal judgement, paragraph 8)

Arguments and reasoning

Issue 1: Is Crimes Ordinance Section 118F(1) unconstitutionally discriminatory against gay men?
 Holding:
Yes

 Arguments:
The Government argued that Section 118F(1) was a formalised, enacted specific common law offence to protect the public from behaviours outraging public decency. The Government also indicated that the Legislature must have taken considerations of genuine needs for enacting the law to regulate homosexual conduct. (Court of Final Appeal judgement, paragraph 26)

Reasoning:
The Court ruled that the Government's concept of a genuine need could be established through the mere act of legislative enactment was plainly wrong. The Court also ruled that the Government failed to identify and make out any genuine needs for enacting Section 118F(1). The Court thus held that Section 118F(1) failed to pass the first hurdle of the justification test. Consequently, Section 118F(1) was declared unconstitutional for infringing the respondents’ right to equality guaranteed under Articles 25 and 39 of the Basic Law and Articles 1 and 22 of the Bill of Rights Ordinance.

The Court agreed with the Government that the Legislature had the right to pass laws protecting the community from outraging public sexual conduct, but the Court emphasised that the Legislature should never have done so in a discriminatory way. The Court pointed out that Section 118F(1) was discriminatory by singling out and criminalising homosexual buggery but no similar laws against heterosexual buggery or other comparable heterosexual acts. And without any satisfactory justifications, the Court could only uphold the lower courts' rulings regarding the unconstitutional nature of Section 118F(1). (Court of Final Appeal judgement, paragraphs 25–30)

Issue 2: What is the proper order to be made when the charge against the defendant is found to be unconstitutional?
 Arguments:
Both parties, the Government and the respondents, of the case stated that the Magistrate had mistakenly dismissed the charges after the declaration of Section 118F(1) unconstitutional. Both sides, at first, suggested different ways for properly dealing with the matter; however, they later on agreed that the Magistrate should have followed the instructions laid out in Section 27 of the Magistrates Ordinance. Thus, the Court was asked for clarification. (Court of Final Appeal judgement, paragraphs 61–62)

Holding:
The Court upheld the approach of following Magistrates Ordinance Section 27 suggested by the parties. The Court ruled that the Magistrate could have amended and substituted the unconstitutional charges of Section 118F(1) with noncontroversial offences through following the instructions provided under Magistrates Ordinance Section 27 without dismissing the case. And through following Section 27, the Court also indicated that the Magistrate could have utilised Section 105 of the Magistrates Ordinance and requested the opinion from a higher court regarding the constitutionality of Section 118F(1). (Court of Final Appeal judgement, paragraphs 63–67, 70-71 & 87)

Significance
 Equal protection against official sexual orientation discrimination is protected under the term “other status” of Articles 1 and 22 of the Bill of Rights Ordinance and thus Articles 25 and 39 of the Basic Law.
 Governmental sexual orientation discrimination was held equivalent to race and sex discrimination.
 The justification test was formulated.

(Court of Final Appeal judgement, paragraphs 11, 20–21)

Aftermath
The Equal Opportunities Commission suggested the Legislative Council to extend the protection covered under the Domestic Violence Ordinance to same sex couples in case of potential violations of this case's merits.

Footnotes

References

The Basic Law
Legislative Council's record of the suggestion from the EOC

LGBT rights case law
Hong Kong case law
Crime in Hong Kong
LGBT rights in Hong Kong